Jean-Louis Moncet  (born  July 30, 1945, in Rabat, Morocco) is a French motorsports journalist.

He is introduced in several Formula One teams and usually works on Grand Prix circuits for French TV and magazines.

Newspapers and magazines career

In 1969, he joined the French popular newspaper France Soir for the South of Paris region, where car races were organized in the Board track racing of Linas-Montlhéry.

In 1971, he became chief redactor of motorsport magazine Sport auto, with Gérard Crombac.

In  1973, with Sport auto team, Gérard Crombac, Thierry Lalande and Luc Melua, he set up a kit fun sport car in a week-end for a low cost and got a mediatic success.

In 1990, he joined Autoplus magazine as sport chief redactor.

TV career

From 1982 to 1990, each week, he is a regular contributor to TF1 TV, AutoMoto program.

From 1990 to 2013, each Grand Prix time, he serves as an analyst, a pre-race interviewer, an on-line commentator from the pit or a post-races interviewer on the main Formula One channel (TF1, TV5, TF1 again in 1992 and CanalPlus in 2013) with French drivers as Patrick Tambay, Jacques Laffite and Alain Prost.

In 2014, he serves as a pre-race interviewer on CanalPlus TV.

Net career
In 2008, he opens his Formula One blog.

References

1945 births
Living people
French journalists
Motorsport journalists
Formula One journalists and reporters
French male non-fiction writers